The Seven Wonders of the World is a studio album by progressive rock artist and keyboardist Rick Wakeman, released in 1995. The album explores instrumentally the themes of each of the Seven Ancient Wonders of the World. Each track is introduced by Garfield Morgan, giving a short biography of each wonder before the instrumental track begins. The album is free of any bombastic attack, and each track has a refined tempo and instrumental progression that outlines each wonder's attributes.

Idea

Album artwork
The artwork is made to look like a vintage painting of one of the wonders, most likely the Statue of Zeus. "Rick Wakeman" and "The Seven Wonders of the World" are written in the font Papyrus.

Track listing

Personnel 

Rick Wakeman - Keyboards
Garfield Morgan - Narration
Stuart Sawney - Percussion Programming, Engineering

References

External links 
 [ Allmusic.com]

Rick Wakeman albums
Art rock albums by English artists
1995 albums
Concept albums